Blasius Ammon, O.F.M., (1558 – June 1590) was an Austrian Franciscan friar and Catholic priest, who was also a composer and singer during the late Renaissance. He was born in Hall in Tirol, then in the Habsburg-ruled County of Tyrol, and died in Vienna.

In 1582 Ammon produced his first collection of compositions, Liber sacratissimarum cantionum selectissimus. He entered the Franciscan Order in 1587, in which he served a priest until his death.

References

External links 
 

1558 births
1590 deaths
People from Hall in Tirol
Austrian Friars Minor
Austrian Roman Catholic priests
16th-century Roman Catholic priests
Austrian classical composers
Renaissance composers
Austrian male classical composers